Eenoolooapik ( 1820 – 1847) was an Inuk guide.

Eenoolooapik travelled to Britain in 1839 with Captain William Penny. He attracted considerable attention from the local population; when he contracted pneumonia, his health was tracked by the local media. He presented his map of Cumberland Sound to the British Navy in an effort to garner support for Penny's proposed expedition to the region. The proposal was denied, but Eenoolooapik nevertheless supported Penny in rediscovering Cumberland Sound in 1840.

He was the subject of an 1841 biography, A narrative of some passages in the history of Eenoolooapik, a young Esquimaux, who was brought to Britain in 1839, in the ship " Neptune" of Aberdeen: an account of the discovery of Hogarth's Sound: remarks on the northern whale fishery, and suggestions for its improvement, &c. &c., written by Alexander McDonald.

His sister Taqulittuq was also a guide, while his brother Totocatapik was a noted voyager.

References

Further reading
A Narrative of some passages in the history of Eenoolooapik
The Inuit as geographers: The case of Eenoolooapik

1847 deaths
Polar explorers